Frank Eggeling (born 27 July 1963) is a retired German football forward.

References

External links
 

1963 births
Living people
German footballers
Bundesliga players
2. Bundesliga players
VfL Bochum players
Eintracht Braunschweig players
Rot-Weiss Essen players
SG Union Solingen players
Association football forwards